Bawlakhe is a town in the Kayah State of eastern part of Burma.

References

External links
Satellite map at Maplandia.com

Township capitals of Myanmar
Populated places in Kayah State